Nan Grey (born Eschal Loleet Grey Miller; July 25, 1918 – July 25, 1993) was an American film actress.

Early years
Grey was born in Houston, Texas. In 1934, at age 16, she went to Hollywood with her mother for a holiday. She was persuaded by a friend to take a screen test and ended up in pictures.

Grey attended the school that Universal Studios operated for children who had film contracts.

Career

Film
Grey's screen debut was in 1934 in Warner Bros.'s Firebird. She starred opposite John Wayne in the 1936 film Sea Spoilers. Grey appeared in the Universal Monsters films Dracula's Daughter (1936) and The Invisible Man Returns (1940). She also appeared in the popular 1936 musical comedy Three Smart Girls, as well as the 1939 sequel Three Smart Girls Grow Up.

Radio
Grey played Kathy Marshall in the NBC radio soap opera Those We Love 1938-1945. Grey played in The Lux Radio Theatre, November 8, 1937 episode, "She Loves Me Not" with Bing Crosby, Joan Blondell, and  Sterling Holloway

Invention
In the 1960s, Grey invented and marketed a cosmetic mirror especially suited to nearsighted women. An obituary noted, "Among its users was Princess Grace of Monaco."

Personal life
On May 4, 1939, Grey married U. S. Racing Hall of Fame jockey Jack Westrope in Phoenix, Arizona.

She married singer Frankie Laine in June 1950, and Laine adopted Grey's daughters (Pam and Jan) from her marriage to Westrope.

Death
The Laines' 43-year union lasted until her death from heart failure on July 25, 1993, her 75th birthday.

Filmography

References

External links

Nan Grey in The Black Doll (1938) from YouTube
Nan Grey in Danger on the Air (1938) from Youtube

1918 births
1993 deaths
American film actresses
Actresses from Houston
20th-century American actresses
American radio actresses
American soap opera actresses